The 2006 season was the Hawthorn Football Club's 82nd season in the Australian Football League and 105th overall.

Fixture

Premiership season

Ladder

References

Hawthorn Football Club seasons
2006 Australian Football League season